This is a list of articles which are themselves or contain substantial lists currently or formerly associated with Minor League Baseball.

Topics

Accomplishments

American Association no-hitters
International League no-hitters
Nashville Sounds no-hitters
Nashville Vols no-hitters
Pacific Coast League no-hitters
Pacific Coast League records

Awards

All-Star Futures Game
Double-A All-Star Game
Triple-A All-Star Game
Top 100 Minor League Teams

Champions

American Association
Appalachian League
California League
Carolina League
Dixie Series
Dominican Summer League
Eastern League
Florida State League
Interleague minor league postseason series
International League
Junior World Series
Midwest League
New York–Penn League
Northwest League
Pacific Coast League
Pioneer League
Serie del Rey
South Atlantic League
Southern Association
Southern League
Texas League
Thruway Cup
Triple-A Classic
Triple-A National Championship Game
Triple-A World Series

Halls of fame

Appalachian League
Arizona Fall League
Buffalo Bisons
California League
Florida State League
International League
New York–Penn League
Pacific Coast League
South Atlantic League
Southern League
Syracuse Chiefs/SkyChiefs
Texas League

Player rosters

Arizona Diamondbacks
Atlanta Braves
Baltimore Orioles
Boston Red Sox
Chicago Cubs
Chicago White Sox
Cincinnati Reds
Cleveland Guardians
Colorado Rockies
Detroit Tigers
Houston Astros
Kansas City Royals
Los Angeles Angels
Los Angeles Dodgers
Miami Marlins
Milwaukee Brewers
Minnesota Twins
New York Mets
New York Yankees
Oakland Athletics
Philadelphia Phillies
Pittsburgh Pirates
San Diego Padres
San Francisco Giants
Seattle Mariners
St. Louis Cardinals
Tampa Bay Rays
Texas Rangers
Toronto Blue Jays
Washington Nationals

Seasons

Eastern League
Akron RubberDucks
Harrisburg Senators

Stadiums

American Association
Arizona Complex League
Arizona Fall League
California League
Carolina League
Double-A
Eastern League
Florida Complex League
Florida State League
High-A
International League
Mexican League
Midwest League
Northwest League
Pacific Coast League
Rookie
Single-A
South Atlantic League
Southern League
Texas League
Triple-A

Team rosters

All-Star Futures Game
Arizona Complex League
Arizona Fall League
California League
Carolina League
Dominican Summer League
Eastern League
Florida Complex League
Florida State League
International League
Mexican League
Midwest League
Northwest League
Pacific Coast League
South Atlantic League
Southern League
Texas League

Teams (historical)

American Association
Eastern League
International League
Pacific Coast League
Southern League
Texas League

Leagues

American Association

Champions
Junior World Series
No-hitters
Stadiums
Teams
Triple-A Classic
Triple-A World Series

Appalachian League

Champions
Hall of Fame

Arizona Complex League

Stadiums
Team rosters

Arizona Fall League

Hall of Fame
Stadiums
Team rosters

California League

Champions
Hall of Fame
Stadiums
Team rosters

Carolina League

Champions
Stadiums
Team rosters

Dominican Summer League

Champions
Team rosters

Eastern League

Champions
Seasons
Stadiums
Team rosters
Teams

Florida Complex League

Stadiums
Team rosters

Florida State League

Champions
Hall of Fame
Stadiums
Team rosters

International League

Champions
Hall of Fame
Junior World Series
No-hitters
Stadiums
Team rosters
Teams
Thruway Cup
Triple-A Classic
Triple-A National Championship Game
Triple-A World Series

Mexican League

Stadiums
Team rosters

Midwest League

Champions
Stadiums
Team rosters

New York–Penn League

Champions
Hall of Fame

Northwest League

Champions
Stadiums
Team rosters

Pacific Coast League

Champions
Hall of Fame
Junior World Series
No-hitters
Records
Stadiums
Team rosters
Teams
Triple-A National Championship Game
Triple-A World Series

Pioneer League

Champions

South Atlantic League

Champions
Hall of Fame
Stadiums
Team rosters

Southern Association

Dixie Series
Champions

Southern League

Champions
Dixie Series
Hall of Fame
Stadiums
Team rosters
Teams

Texas League

Champions
Dixie Series
Hall of Fame
Stadiums
Team rosters
Teams

Classes

Double-A

All-Star Game
Stadiums
Teams

High-A

Stadiums
Teams

Rookie

Stadiums
Teams

Single-A

Stadiums
Teams

Triple-A

All-Star Game
Classic
Junior World Series
National Championship Game
Stadiums
Teams
World Series

Teams

Halls of fame

Buffalo Bisons
Syracuse Chiefs/SkyChiefs

No-hitters

Nashville Sounds
Nashville Vols

Seasons

Akron RubberDucks
Harrisburg Senators

See also

Minor League Baseball leagues and teams
Developmental and minor sports leagues

 
Minor League Baseball